The following is a list of state highways in Odisha, India.

See also
 Biju Expressway

References

Odisha

Highways